Toe Laew (Grown Up) is a Thai television show hosted by Pathompong Reonchaidee (Toy), Patara Eksangkul (Foei), Chanagun Arpornsutinan (Gunsmile), Vachirawit Chiva-aree (Bright) and Kanaphan Puitrakul (First). Each episode features different places where the hosts travel to various destinations to live and eat like the people in those places.

Hosts

Current hosts 
 Pathompong Reonchaidee (Toy) 
 Patara Eksangkul (Foei) 
 Chanagun Arpornsutinan (Gunsmile) 
 Vachirawit Chiva-aree (Bright) 
 Kanaphan Puitrakul (First)

Former hosts 
 Krithawat Akachai (Non)
 Panta Pattanaampaiwong (Plai)
 Akalavut Mankalasut (Pangpond)
 Yoon Jong Young (Jedai)
 Arachaporn Pokinpakorn (Goy)

Seasons

Season 1 
The first season premiered on GMM 25 on 10 April 2016, airing on Saturdays at 12:00 ICT with Pathompong Reonchaidee (Toy), Patara Eksangkul (Foei), Krittawat Ekkachai (Non) and Panta Pattanaampaiwong (Plai) as hosts. It aired at 12:15 ICT from its 89th to 115th episodes and was later moved to an earlier timeslot at 10:00 ICT on the 149th episode until its last episode. The show's first season concluded on 29 December 2019. It is also currently available for streaming on YouTube and LINE TV.

Season 2 
The second season premiered on GMM 25 and AIS Play on 26 September 2020, airing on Saturdays at 10:00 ICT and 12:00 ICT, respectively. It is also currently available for streaming on YouTube.

References

External links 

Toe Laew (Season 1) on GMM 25 website 
Toe Laew (Season 2) on GMM 25 website 
Toe Laew (Season 1) on LINE TV
Toe Laew (Season 2) on AIS Play

GMM 25 original programming
Thai television shows